Miquel Brines Ferrer (Simat de la Valldigna), a.k.a. Coeter I, is a Valencian pilota player, in the category of raspall. He is brother of the also champion Paco Luis, Coeter II.

List of achievements
 Champion of the Raspall Individual Championship: 1989.
 Runner-up of the Raspall Individual Championship: 1990.
 Champion of the Raspall Teams Championship: 1990, together with Leandro I.

Pilotaris from the Valencian Community
Year of birth missing (living people)
Living people